

Inclusion criteria
This is an annotated list of films by year that are notable for featuring, or including scenes of, Gay bathhouses or gay themes set in bathhouses. Films link to an associated Wikipedia page or, if unavailable, the associated listing on IMDb. Films with no gay context will not be included.

The purpose of this list is to illustrate the often taboo subject of gay bathhouse culture and its influence.

Film list

References

Gay bathhouses
Gay bathhouses
Films featuring gay bathhouses